The Lakshadweep Prohibition Regulation, 1979 bans the import, export, transportation, possession and manufacture of liquor or any intoxicating drugs in the Union Territory of Lakshadweep.

See also
The Nagaland Liquor Total Prohibition Act, 1989
Bombay Prohibition (Gujarat Amendment) 2009
Bihar Excise (Amendment) Act, 2016

References

India
Alcohol law in India
State legislation in India
Government of Lakshadweep
1979 in India
1979 in law